Moyle District Council was a local council in County Antrim in the northeast of Northern Ireland. It merged with Ballymoney Borough Council, Coleraine Borough Council and Limavady Borough Council in May 2015 under local government reorganisation to become Causeway Coast and Glens District Council.

As a consequence, in 1991 the local government boundary commission originally recommended that the council should be merged with the neighbouring Ballymoney council to create a new council called "Dalriada". This was strongly opposed by both councils and also by Ballymena which would have gained the Glens of Antrim and a small part of Ballymoney council in the process. After a public enquiry the plans were shelved and Moyle was preserved.

Council headquarters were in Ballycastle.

The council was composed of 15 councillors who were elected from three electoral areas (Ballycastle, Giant's Causeway and The Glens) every four years by a system of proportional representation.

Most of the former district forms the North Antrim constituency (together with the neighbouring former Local Council areas of Ballymena and Ballymoney), for elections to the Westminster Parliament and Northern Ireland Assembly. The exception is the Glens of Antrim area, most of which is part of the East Antrim constituency. The district was a majority Catholic enclave in the otherwise Protestant County Antrim.

Elections

2005 Election results

2011 Election results

An Independent elected in the 2011 elections joined Sinn Féin in May 2012.

Review of Public Administration
Under the Review of Public Administration (RPA) the Council was due to merge with Coleraine Borough Council, Limavady Borough Council and Ballymoney Borough Council in 2011 to form Causeway Coast and Glens District, a single council for the enlarged area totalling  and a population of 131,564. The next election was due to take place in May 2009, but on 25 April 2008, Shaun Woodward, Secretary of State for Northern Ireland announced that the scheduled 2009 district council elections were to be postponed until 2011. The merger with Coleraine, Limavady and Ballymoney councils was confirmed in September 2011 and took effect in 2015.

Population
The area covered by Moyle District Council had a population of 17,050 residents according to the 2011 Northern Ireland census.

See also
Local Councils in Northern Ireland
Knocknacarry

References

External links
Causeway Coast and Glens Tourism
Ballycastle Website

 
Politics of County Antrim
District councils of Northern Ireland, 1973–2015